Alfred Patrick Byrne (12 June 1913 – 26 July 1952) was an Irish politician. A clerk by profession, he was elected to Dáil Éireann as an Independent Teachta Dála (TD) for Dublin North-West at the 1937 general election. He was re-elected at the 1938 and 1943 general elections but lost his seat at the 1944 general election. He re-gained his seat at the 1948 general election and was re-elected at the 1951 general election. He died in 1952 and the subsequent by-election on 12 November 1952 was won by his brother Thomas Byrne.

His father Alfie Byrne was an MP, TD, Senator and Lord Mayor of Dublin. Another brother Patrick Byrne was also a TD.

See also
Families in the Oireachtas

References

1913 births
1952 deaths
Independent TDs
Members of the 9th Dáil
Members of the 10th Dáil
Members of the 11th Dáil
Members of the 13th Dáil
Members of the 14th Dáil
Politicians from County Dublin